Melle is a railway station located in Melle, Germany. The station is located on the Löhne–Rheine railway. The train services are operated by WestfalenBahn.

Train services
The station is  served by the following services:

Regional services  Rheine - Osnabrück - Minden - Hannover - Braunschweig
Local services  Bad Bentheim - Rheine - Osnabrück - Herford - Bielefeld

References

Railway stations in Lower Saxony
Melle, Germany